Bungkudu Adalah salah satu Desa yang terletak di Kecamatan bukal,kabupaten buol Sulawesi tengah.B

History 
Daxcon was founded in 1996 in Central Illinois. Its management team first started working in the engineering design industry in the 1980s. The company subsequently opened offices in St. Louis, Missouri and Detroit, Michigan.

The company's customers include Caterpillar, Inc., Ford Motor Company, Komatsu, Boeing, and Case New Holland.

On January 15, 2010, Daxcon Engineering was acquired by Infotech Enterprises of Hyderabad, India.

Services

Daxcon provides services in several different divisions: Design Engineering, Finite Element Analysis, Training & Software, and Virtual Engineering.

Design engineering
Design engineering projects that Daxcon has worked on in the past include: Class A surfacing on interior/exterior components, engine and engine installation packaging, internal combustion engine performance, structural component design, intake and exhaust manifold design, HVAC design and packaging, and cooling package layout and design for generator and vehicle operations.

Finite element analysis
Finite element analysis involves studying a customer’s product for any weakness that may be present in the material. Daxcon uses the following formats for analysis: Failure Mode Effects Analysis (FMEA), linear and non-linear statistics, normal mode dynamics, thermally induced stress, load path characterization, weld fatigue life, mechanism simulations and animation, bolted joint study, and hand calculations.

Training and software
With the use of a Learning Management System (LMS), Daxcon uses consulting agents to produce custom training software for engineers, include software customised for specific projects.

Virtual engineering
Daxcon utilizes 3D modeling, converting 2D drawings into 3D parametric drawings, run complex 3D modeling simulations, and use many forms of Computer Aided Design (CAD). The company also trains customer companies to create their own 3D modeling and 2D or 3D prints.

Industries

Daxcon  has worked in industries including Defense & Aerospace, Mining & Construction, Automotive, Consumer Products, and Agriculture. The company also works with OEMs to provide the automotive industry with support when dealing with large supply chains. Daxcon engineers also work as consultants for companies in the development automobile components.

Consumer products
Daxcon works with small companies to bring their new products to market, using FMEAs, or prototype analysis to assist in the search for patents for the new product. The company assesses the marketability of new products to save small companies time and production costs. The company also provides design work and assistance to individuals and/or small companies needing the manpower to develop an idea or design.

See also
 Ford Motor Company
 Boeing
 Komatsu Limited
 Caterpillar, Inc.
 Case New Holland
 Infotech Enterprises

References

External links
 
 NOFORN

1996 establishments in Illinois
2010 disestablishments in Illinois
2010 mergers and acquisitions
Companies based in Peoria County, Illinois
Consulting firms of the United States
Defunct technology companies of the United States
Technology companies established in 1996
Technology companies disestablished in 2010